Susan Waddington (born 23 August 1944) is a British education official and Labour Party politician who was Member of the European Parliament for Leicester.

Born in Norfolk, Waddington attended Blyth Grammar School and the University of Leicester.  She worked as an adult education field officer, before becoming an assistant director at Derbyshire LEA, and then at Birmingham LEA.

In 1973, Waddington was elected to Leicestershire County Council, serving until 1991, and she was leader of the council from 1982 until 1984.  At the 1994 European Parliament election, she was elected to represent Leicester, serving until 1999.

Waddington was president of the European Association for the Education of Adults from 2008 to 2013.

She is currently (2019) councillor for Fosse ward on Leicester City Council and has been an Assistant City Mayor under the elected Mayor of Leicester Peter Soulsby.

References

1944 births
Living people
Alumni of the University of Leicester
Councillors in Leicestershire
Labour Party (UK) MEPs
Labour Party (UK) councillors
MEPs for England 1994–1999
20th-century women MEPs for England
Adult education leaders
Leaders of local authorities of England
Women councillors in England